is the name given to the spear in Shinto used to raise the primordial land-mass, Onogoro-shima, from the sea. It is often represented as a naginata.

According to the Kojiki, Shinto's genesis gods Izanagi and Izanami were responsible for creating the first land. To help them do this, they were given a spear decorated with jewels, named Ame-no (heavenly) nu-hoko (jewelled spear), by older heavenly gods. The two deities then went to the bridge between heaven and earth, Ame-no-ukihashi ("floating bridge of heaven"), and churned the sea below with the naginata. When drops of salty water fell from the tip, they formed into the first island, Onogoro-shima. Izanagi and Izanami then descended from the bridge of heaven and made their home on the island.

References

Japanese mythology
Mythological weapons